Kutchi may refer to:

 Of, from, or something related to the Kutch district in Gujarat, India
 Kutchi language, language spoken in the Kutch district as well as Sindh, Pakistan
 Kutchi people, speakers of the language
 Kutchi cinema, Kutchi-language film industry in India
 Kutchi-Swahili, creole of the Indian diaspora in Africa, derived from the Kutchi and Swahili languages
 Kutchi Memon, Indian ethnic group of the Memon people
 Kutchi Memons in Bombay
 Kutchi cuisine, cuisine within the Gujarati cuisine of India
 Kutch Gurjar Kshatriya, Indian sub-caste of the Gurjars
 Kachchhi Ghodi dance, Indian dance form
 Kutchicetus, fossil genus of early whales, type fossil from Kutch

See also
 Kutch (disambiguation)
 Cutch (disambiguation)
 Kuchi or Kochi, nomads of Afghanistan
 Kachi (disambiguation)

Language and nationality disambiguation pages